Ait Igas is a small town and rural commune in Taroudant Province of the Souss-Massa-Drâa region of Morocco. At the time of the 2004 census, the commune had a total population of 9553 people living in 1308 households.

References

Populated places in Taroudannt Province
Rural communes of Souss-Massa